This is a list of diplomatic missions of Mozambique, excluding honorary consulates. Mozambique is the only former Portuguese colony to be part of the Commonwealth of Nations, and thus has High Commissions in the capitals of its fellow member-states.

Africa

America

Asia

Europe

Multilateral organizations

Gallery

See also
 Foreign relations of Mozambique
 List of diplomatic missions in Mozambique
 Visa policy of Mozambique

References

Mozambican Ministry of Foreign Affairs

Mozambique
Diplomatic missions